The First Bank of Joseph, at 2nd and Main Sts. in Joseph, Oregon, is a  historic building that was built in 1887.  It was listed on the National Register of Historic Places in 1978.

According to its NRHP nomination, it is "a fine example of High Victorian Italianate Commercial architecture. Although the style was common in Portland and the Willamette Valley, in
the isolated town of Joseph in the northeast corner of the state, such a fine example
of the style is quite unusual."

It was converted to a physician's office and surgery in 1917;  in 1927 the city took it over and used it as a community center with an upstairs performing arts theater.  The building served as the city hall and library before 1973.  After being vacant for several years, the building was renovated and, at the time of NRHP nomination, served as the Wallowa County Museum.

References

External links

 Wallowa County Museum - official site

National Register of Historic Places in Wallowa County, Oregon
Italianate architecture in Oregon
Commercial buildings completed in 1887
Buildings and structures in Wallowa County, Oregon
Bank buildings on the National Register of Historic Places in Oregon
Museums in Wallowa County, Oregon
Joseph, Oregon